The National Society of Hispanic Physicists (NSHP) was established in 1996 with the goal of promoting the participation and advancement of Hispanic-Americans in physics and celebrating the contributions of Hispanic-American physicists to the study and teaching of physics.

Brief history
A grant from the Sloan Foundation was awarded to the Pan-American Association for Physics to establish the National Society of Hispanic Physicists (NSHP). The Founding Meeting of the Society was held in Austin at the University of Texas in April, 1996 and the first annual meeting was held in Houston, Texas in October 1997.

The US-Mexico Workshop on Teaching Introductory Physics, the first major project undertaken by the Society, was held later that year in Monterrey, Mexico. The project was a bilingual joint venture between the NSHP and the Instituto Tecnológico y de Estudios Superiores de Monterrey (ITESM) to explore the goals of the introductory physics sequence and recent pedagogical developments to meet those goals.
The Hispanic Physicist, the official newsletter of the NSHP, has been in publication since 1997.

The NSHP meets jointly with other societies organizing sessions, hosting social functions, promoting discussions of diversity and inclusion issues in the physics community, and recognizing achievements of Hispanic-American physics students and faculty.

The National Society of Hispanic Physicists has met annually with the Society for the Advancement of Chicanos and Native Americans in Science (SACNAS) since 1997 and twice with the American Association of Physics Teachers (AAPT) (in Austin, TX in 2003 and Albuquerque, NM in 2005). In addition, the NSHP has met at sectional meetings of the American Physical Society (APS) and the American Astronomical Society (AAS). More recently the Society has met annually with the National Society of Black Physicists.

The organization was incorporated under the umbrella of the Southeastern Universities Research Association (SURA) in August 2014.

Mission and Goals
The purpose of this society is to promote the professional well-being and recognize the accomplishments of Hispanic physicists within the scientific community of the United States and within society at large.

The Society seeks to develop and support efforts to increase opportunities for Hispanics in physics and to increase the number of practicing Hispanic physicists, particularly by encouraging Hispanic students to enter a career in physics.

... from the Constitution of the National Society of Hispanic Physicists, 1997

The Society pursues its mission through four very broad activities.

1) Promoting the study of physics among Hispanic students. This includes encouraging and mentoring students where appropriate, developing resources for undergraduate study, research, and participation in the scientific community.

2) Identifying and heralding the accomplishments of Hispanic physics faculty and students in research, teaching, study, mentoring, and outreach.

3) Providing a forum through which Hispanic faculty and students can come together and celebrate not just the pursuit, and passion, of science but also sharing a rich and vibrant culture.

4) Working with the larger physics community as teachers, faculty, administrators, and societies work to transform the physics community into a more inclusive and diversified one. This work includes joining with other societies, developing resources, and highlighting effective practices and programs.

See also
 American Association of Physics Teachers
 American Astronomical Society
 American Physical Society
 National Society of Black Physicists

References

External links
 National Society of Hispanic Physicists
 National Society of Black Physicists
 American Association of Physics Teachers
 American Astronomical Society
 American Physical Society
 Society for the Advancement of Chicanos and Native Americans in Science

1996 establishments in the United States
Physics organizations
Hispanic and Latino American professional organizations
Organizations established in 1996